Dolnik may refer to:

Dolnik, Lower Silesian Voivodeship (south-west Poland)
Dolnik, Greater Poland Voivodeship (west-central Poland)
Dolnik, Silesian Voivodeship (south Poland)
Dolnik, West Pomeranian Voivodeship (north-west Poland)

People with the surname
This surname (spelling variants: Dolnik, Dolnick) is common among Slovaks and Jews.

Dolnik 
Viktor Dolnik (1938–2013), Russian ornithologist
Vladimir Dolnik (born 1993), Slovak professional ice hockey player

Dolnick 
Ben Dolnick, writer
Edward Dolnick, writer
Sam Dolnick, journalist, editor of The New York Times